Skip Blumberg (born October 10, 1947) is one of the original camcorder-for-broadcast TV producers, and among the first wave of video artists in the 1970s. His early work reflects the era's emphasis on guerrilla tactics and medium-specific graphics, but his more recent work takes on more global issues. His work has screened widely on television and at museums. His video Pick Up Your Feet: The Double Dutch Show (1981) is considered a classic documentary video and was included in the Museum of Television and Radio's exhibition TV Critics' All-time Favorite Shows. His cultural documentaries and performance videos have been broadcast on PBS, National Geographic TV, Showtime, Bravo, Nickelodeon, among others.

He was a part of the early video collective Videofreex.

He is currently producing works for The My Hero Project. and Sesame Street along with various independent productions.

Works

 When I was a Worker Like Lavern, 1976 - An early example of Blumberg's personal documentary approach begins as an informative look at the mail-order distribution process, and ends as a candid observation of management/labor relations.
 For a Moment You Fly, 1978 - A portrait of a unique one ring circus in NYC. This is an informal portrait of a circus that emphasizes "human-sized events" as an alternative to the mainstream circus, suggesting an affinity with Blumberg's own "human-sized" video as an alternative to mainstream television.
 Contests USA, 1980 - A three-part documentary; Summer Ski Jumping, The Ugly Dog Contest, Festival of (Musical) Saws, that explore the "extraordinary" aspects of "ordinary" people.
 Pick Up Your Feet: The Double Dutch Show, 1981 - A look at the young participants of the Double Dutch Championship in New York City.
 Sesame Street - Since 1988, Skip Blumburg has created over 75 segments for the show.
 Nick At Nite ID's, 1991 - Skip Blumburg created 4 ID's for the block using pixelation & rotoscoping.
 Cookie Girl in the Hot Zone, 2001 - A short produced for myhero.com about 12-year-old Jemma Brown, who started to serve cookies to the firefighters 3 days after the September 11, 2001 attacks on the World Trade Center.
 Con Creep, 2001 - A portrait of a New York street musician who has maintained financial stability despite the constant presence of the police force.

Awards and honors
 Ohio State University Journalism Award
 Guggenheim Fellowship
 Participating Filmmaker - Sundance Institute Dance Video Lab
 Esquire Magazine’s “Best of the Next Generation”
 Museum of TV and Radio’s “TV Critics’ Favorite Shows of All-Time.”

See also
 List of video artists
 Ant Farm
 TVTV
 Chip Lord

References

External links
 
 Pick Up Your Feet: The Double Dutch Show on YouTube
 Skip Blumberg at Electronic Arts Intermix

Living people
American video artists
Artists from New York City
1947 births